The 1985 Sultan Azlan Shah Cup was the second edition of field hockey tournament the Sultan Azlan Shah Cup.

Participating nations
Six countries participated in the 1985 tournament:

Results

Pool A

Fixtures

Pool B

Fixtures

Classification round

Fifth and sixth place

Semifinals

Third and fourth place

Final

Final standings
This ranking does not reflect the actual performance of the team as the ranking issued by the International Hockey Federation. This is just a benchmark ranking in the Sultan Azlan Shah Cup only.

References

External links
Official website

1985 in field hockey
1985
1985 in Malaysian sport
1985 in Indian sport
1985 in Pakistani sport
1985 in Spanish sport